Greig McDonald (born 12 May 1982 in Dunfermline) is a Scottish football player and manager. Greig is currently managing East Fife.

McDonald during his playing days is referred to as Toro or El Toro (Meaning he was an absolute bull in defence) and was liked for his nickname at his time at East Fife. McDonald also was largely part of the East Fife team that stormed league two in 2007–08 season by a country mile.

On 14 August 2015 McDonald sign for Annan Athletic

McDonald was appointed caretaker manager of Stirling Albion after Jocky Scott left the club in December 2011. He became the youngest manager of a senior league club in the UK when he was appointed Stirling Albion manager on a permanent basis on 22 January 2012. McDonald missed a league victory against Rangers in October 2012 as he was getting married on the same day. He led the Binos to promotion to Scottish League One via the play-offs the following season by beating his former club East Fife in the final of that playoffs that year, but left the club in October 2014 with them sitting bottom of League One.

On 8 December 2021, McDonald joins boyhood club East Fife as an assistant manager role at the club. Fast forward to 25 October 2022 McDonald was appointed manager of East Fife.

Managerial statistics

Initially caretaker at Stirling Albion and appointed permanently on 22 January 2012
 Initially caretaker at East Fife and appointed permanently on 25 October 2022

Honours

East Fife
Scottish League Two champion (1): 2007–08 (Footballer)

Stirling Albion
Scottish League One play-offs (1): 2013–14 (Player/Manager)

References

External links

1982 births
Association football defenders
Brechin City F.C. players
Dunfermline Athletic F.C. players
East Fife F.C. players
Living people
Scottish Football League managers
Scottish Football League players
Scottish football managers
Scottish footballers
Scottish Professional Football League managers
Footballers from Dunfermline
Stirling Albion F.C. managers
Stirling Albion F.C. players
East Fife F.C. managers